CH Crucis is a solitary variable star in the southern constellation of Crux. It has the Gould designation 35 G. Crucis. The object is visible to the naked eye as a faint, blue-white hued point of light with an apparent visual magnitude that fluctuates around 4.91. The star is located approximately 780 light years distant from the Sun based on parallax, and is drifting further away with a radial velocity of about +12.5 km/s. It is a member of the nearby Sco OB2 association.

This is a conventional shell star, which is understood to be a Be star that is being viewed edge-on. Houk (1975) found a stellar classification of B5III, while Hiltner et al. assigned it to B6IV; suggesting it is a B-type star that is evolving off the main sequence. Samus et al. (2017) have tentatively classified it as a Gamma Cassiopeiae variable that ranges in brightness from magnitude 4.88 down to 5.7.

CH Crucis has 5.3 times the mass of the Sun and 11.2 times the Sun's radius. It is radiating 1,073 times the luminosity of the Sun from its photosphere at an effective temperature of 10,600 K. It is spinning rapidly with estimates of the projected rotational velocity ranging up to 240 or 250 km/s. This is giving the star an oblate shape with an equatorial bulge that is an estimated 18% larger than the polar radius.

References 

Be stars
B-type subgiants
B-type giants
Gamma Cassiopeiae variable stars

Crux (constellation)
Durchmusterung objects
110335
061966
4823
Crucis, CH